Nanini may refer to:

 Joe Nanini (1955-2000), American drummer
 Giovanni Maria Nanino (c. 1543–1607), Italian composer also known as Nanini